

This is a list of the National Register of Historic Places listings in Northumberland County, Pennsylvania.

This is intended to be a complete list of the properties and districts on National Register of Historic Places in Northumberland County, Pennsylvania. The locations of National Register properties and districts for which the latitude and longitude coordinates are included below, may be seen in a map.

There are 29 properties and districts listed on the National Register in the county. One site is further designated as a National Historic Landmark.  Another property was once listed but has been removed.

Current listings

|}

Former listing

|}

See also

 List of National Historic Landmarks in Pennsylvania
 National Register of Historic Places listings in Pennsylvania
 List of Pennsylvania state historical markers in Northumberland County

References

 
Northumberland County